Mraljeb Ayed Mansoor (born 1939) is a Kuwaiti long-distance runner. He competed in the marathon at the 1968 Summer Olympics.

References

1939 births
Living people
Athletes (track and field) at the 1968 Summer Olympics
Kuwaiti male long-distance runners
Kuwaiti male marathon runners
Olympic athletes of Kuwait